Jimmy Green (born August 6, 1969) is an American professional golfer.

Green was born in Meridian, Mississippi. He played college golf at Auburn University, where he won six events including the 1991 Southeastern Conference Championship. He turned professional in 1992.

Green played on the Buy.com Tour (now Nationwide Tour) in 1996 and 1998, winning once at the 1996 Nike Buffalo Open. He played on the PGA Tour in 1997 and 1999–2001. His best finish was T-4 at the 2000 AT&T Pebble Beach National Pro-Am.

Green is currently the General Manager at the Auburn University Club in Auburn, Alabama.

Amateur wins
1991 Southeastern Conference Championship

Professional wins (1)

Nike Tour wins (1)

Nike Tour playoff record (1–0)

Results in major championships

Note: Green never played in the Masters Tournament nor the PGA Championship.

CUT = missed the half-way cut
"T" = tied

See also
1996 PGA Tour Qualifying School graduates
1998 Nike Tour graduates
1999 PGA Tour Qualifying School graduates

References

External links

American male golfers
Auburn Tigers men's golfers
PGA Tour golfers
Korn Ferry Tour graduates
Golfers from Mississippi
Golfers from Alabama
Sportspeople from Meridian, Mississippi
People from Daphne, Alabama
1969 births
Living people